Rubén Anuarbe Martín (born 18 June 1981 in Madrid) is a Spanish former footballer who played as a defender (either right or left-back).

References

External links

1981 births
Living people
Spanish footballers
Footballers from Madrid
Association football defenders
Segunda División players
Segunda División B players
Tercera División players
Divisiones Regionales de Fútbol players
CF Fuenlabrada B players
CF Fuenlabrada footballers
UD San Sebastián de los Reyes players
Racing Club Portuense players
AD Alcorcón footballers